Daikaiju (stylized "DaiKaiju") is a kaiju-themed surf punk band from Huntsville, Alabama, now based out of Houston, usually consisting of two guitarists, a bassist, and a drummer. The band formed in the winter of 1999 and first performed in January 2000. The band has played shows across Europe, eastern Asia, and North America. As of 2022, the band is still actively touring.

History 

Daikaiju originally formed in the winter of 1999.

In 2005, the band released their first full-length album, Daikaiju. Of the album's ten tracks, five were previously recorded (in an earlier form) on 2001's Monster Surf, and two more were previously heard on 2002's The Phasing Spider Menace. The album received mostly positive reviews from critics, with Pitchfork Media giving the album a 7.8/10, praising the band's "prog muscle" and calling it an "impressive full-length debut".

In 2010, the band released their second full-length album, titled Phase 2.

In a 2012 interview with Florida Geek Scene, the band was asked about the change in personnel between Daikaiju and Phase 2. Daikaiju, in response, referred to the departing members as "casualties".

In 2013, the band toured the Far East visiting China, South Korea, and Japan. Its visit to Japan, in particular, was highly anticipated by fans and the band itself. Daikaiju tied Public Image Ltd. as the 'Best show by a foreign touring act' in Time Out Beijing's "Year's end roundup: the best of Beijing music" for 2013.

Performing style 

Daikaiju performs while wearing kabuki masks, and using pseudonyms. They do not speak during performances, instead communicating using hand signals. The band often sets fire to their instruments during live shows.

Interaction with media 

Due to how secretive the band is, they rarely grant interviews, and do not mention their real names or private lives (apart from their opinions on monster movies such as Tristar's Godzilla, which they agreed to call Godzilla "in name only") in the interviews they do agree to.

It is a reflection of how wild Daikaiju's live performances are that, on their own website as well as in interviews, they refer to these performances as "attacks"; or instead, in a 2013 interview with Time Out Beijing, referring to them as "Most exciting shower of golden radiance!!!" This likely refers to the band's tendency to use lighter fluid to spray their instruments while the instruments are on fire.

Similarity to Man or Astro-man 

The similarity of the band's sound to Man or Astro-man? has fueled some unconfirmed speculation that the band may contain members of that band. The band's only response to this speculation, a denial (though characteristically vague), appeared in an August 2012 interview:

"Daikaiju have many member of man: secret-man, rock-man, hit-man, and mobile-man!!! Daikaiju also like taste of astro-man but have preference of lizard-man... or aqua-man!!!"

Discography 

The band has released two EPs, two studio albums, and two singles.

See also
Laika & the Cosmonauts
Instrumental surf
The Mermen

References

External links
daikaiju.org

American punk rock groups
Surf music groups